Silverton may refer to:

Places

Australia 

Silverton, New South Wales
Silverton Wind Farm
Silverton, South Australia

Canada 

 Silverton, British Columbia

South Africa 

 Silverton, Pretoria

United Kingdom 

Silverton, Devon, England
Silverton Park
Silverton railway station
Silverton, Dumbarton, Scotland

United States 
Silverton, Colorado
Silverton Mountain
Silverton Railroad
Silverton, Idaho
Silverton Township, Pennington County, Minnesota
Silverton, Missouri
Silverton, New Jersey
Silverton, Oregon
Silverton Hospital
Silverton reservoir
Silverton, Ohio
Silverton, Texas
Silverton, Washington
Silverton, West Virginia

Other uses
Silverton (surname)
Silverton Las Vegas, a hotel and casino in Enterprise, Nevada, U.S.
Southern & Silverton Rail, formerly Silverton Rail, an Australian rail operator
Silverton Tramway
Silverton Partners, an American venture capital firm 
Silverton, Oklahoma, a fictional place in Into the Storm (2014 film)
, a Royal Navy ship
Silverton High School (disambiguation)

See also

Silvertone (disambiguation)
Silvertown, a district of London, England